Kierzno may refer to the following villages in Poland:
Kierzno, Greater Poland Voivodeship (west-central Poland)
Kierżno, Lower Silesian Voivodeship (south-west Poland)
Kierzno, Lubusz Voivodeship (west Poland)